The men's horizontal bar competition was one of eight events for male competitors in artistic gymnastics at the 1972 Summer Olympics in Munich. The qualification and final rounds took place on August 27, 29 and September 1 at the Olympiahalle. There were 113 competitors from 26 nations; nations entering the team event had 6 gymnasts while other nations could have up to 3 gymnasts. Japan reached the height of its success in the event this year, thoroughly dominating the event by taking the top five places (with the final Japanese gymnast placing 10th). Mitsuo Tsukahara was the winner, with Sawao Kato second and Shigeru Kasamatsu third. Japan had now won the event in four of the last five Games. The only finalist from outside Japan was Nikolai Andrianov of the Soviet Union.

Background

This was the 13th appearance of the event, which is one of the five apparatus events held every time there were apparatus events at the Summer Olympics (no apparatus events were held in 1900, 1908, 1912, or 1920). Four of the six finalists from 1968 returned: joint gold medalists Mikhail Voronin of the Soviet Union and Akinori Nakayama of Japan, bronze medalist Eizo Kenmotsu of Japan, and fourth-place finisher Klaus Köste of East Germany. Kenmotsu was the reigning (1970) world champion, with Nakayama the runner-up and Köste tied with Takuji Hayata of Japan (who was not on the Munich Olympic team).

Liechtenstein, New Zealand, and North Korea each made their debut in the men's horizontal bar. The United States made its 12th appearance, most of any nation, having missed only the inaugural 1896 Games.

Competition format

Each nation entered a team of six gymnasts or up to three individual gymnasts. All entrants in the gymnastics competitions performed both a compulsory exercise and a voluntary exercise for each apparatus. The scores for all 12 exercises were summed to give an individual all-around score. (One gymnast who entered the all-around competition did not perform on the vault.) These exercise scores were also used for qualification for the apparatus finals. The two exercises (compulsory and voluntary) for each apparatus were summed to give an apparatus score; the top 6 in each apparatus participated in the finals; others were ranked 7th through 113th. Half of the scores from the preliminary carried over to the final.

Schedule

All times are Central European Time (UTC+1)

Results

One-hundred thirteen gymnasts competed in the compulsory and optional rounds on August 27 and 29.  The six highest scoring gymnasts advanced to the final on September 1.

References

Official Olympic Report
www.gymnasticsresults.com
www.gymn-forum.net

Men's horizontal bar
Men's 1972
Men's events at the 1972 Summer Olympics